Emanuel Rodrigues Novo (born 26 August 1992) is a Portuguese professional footballer who plays for Saudi club Al-Riyadh SC as a goalkeeper.

Club career
Born in Vila do Conde, Novo played as a youth for local clubs Varzim S.C. and Rio Ave FC. His early senior career was however spent at a lower level – including A.D.C. Balasar of the Porto Football Association's third district league in 2013–14 – though he won a national title in beach soccer with S.C. Braga in 2014.

After two years with F.C. Famalicão, the latter in the Segunda Liga, Novo signed a deal of the same length with G.D. Chaves in the Primeira Liga. Third choice to Ricardo Nunes and António Filipe, he made just one brief substitute appearance in each of his seasons with the team from Trás-os-Montes; the first was on 8 May 2017 in the final matchday (2–1 away loss against G.D. Estoril Praia), in which the latter was sent off with six minutes remaining and he was immediately beaten by a free kick from Mattheus.

On 14 June 2018, Novo returned to Varzim on a two-year deal. The following 1 July, he moved abroad for the first time, joining several compatriots at FC Hermannstadt in Romania. He made his debut in Liga I 18 days later, a 0–2 home defeat to local rivals CS Gaz Metan Mediaș.

Novo came back to his own country's second tier on 4 September 2020, on a one-year deal at F.C. Penafiel. At the end of the campaign, he was on the books of F.C. Felgueiras 1932 for a few weeks before agreeing to a contract at Jeddah Club in the Saudi First Division League. 

On 18 June 2022, Novo joined Al-Riyadh SC in the same country and league.

References

External links

Portuguese League profile 

1992 births
Living people
People from Vila do Conde
Sportspeople from Porto District
Portuguese footballers
Association football goalkeepers
Primeira Liga players
Liga Portugal 2 players
Segunda Divisão players
Varzim S.C. players
Rio Ave F.C. players
AD Oliveirense players
F.C. Famalicão players
G.D. Chaves players
F.C. Penafiel players
F.C. Felgueiras 1932 players
Liga I players
FC Hermannstadt players
Saudi First Division League players
Jeddah Club players
Al-Riyadh SC players
Portuguese expatriate footballers
Expatriate footballers in Romania
Expatriate footballers in Saudi Arabia
Portuguese expatriate sportspeople in Romania
Portuguese expatriate sportspeople in Saudi Arabia